Marq  (formerly Lucidpress) is a web-based desktop publishing software application. Built on web standards such as HTML5 and JavaScript, Marq is supported in modern web browsers including Google Chrome, Firefox, Safari and Internet Explorer 8+. Though it started as a platform for single users and small businesses, Marq has found substantial user bases in both education and enterprise spaces.

History 
In October 2013, Lucid Software, Inc. announced Lucidpress as a public beta version. Following its release, Lucidpress was featured in TechCrunch, VentureBeat and PC World, with TechCrunch noting: "I had a chance to test the app before its launch and it is indeed very easy to use. If you've ever used a desktop publishing app in the past, you'll feel right at home with Marq, as it features the same kind of standard top-bar menu and layout options as most other publishing apps. In terms of features, it can also hold its own against similar desktop-based apps."

In May 2015, Lucidpress hit 1 million users. One year later in June 2016, Marq hit 2 million users and announced its Advanced Template Locking feature.

In November 2016, Lucidpress announced its Print & Ship feature, by which users can order printed versions of the documents they create in Marq.

In May 2021, Lucidpress announced that it had been acquired by Charles Thayne Capital ("CTC"), a growth-oriented and technology-focused private investment firm.

In July 2022, Lucidpress officially rebranded to Marq.

Investment 
Lucid Software raised $1 million in Seed in 2011, led by Google Ventures.

In May 2014, the company received a $5 million investment. The round was led by Salt Lake-based Kickstart Seed Fund.

In September 2016, the company received a $36 million investment from Spectrum Equity, whose previous investments include other online platforms such as Ancestry.com, Lynda.com, Prezi, and SurveyMonkey. Kickstart Seed Fund and Grayhawk Capital also participated in the round.

See also
Adobe InDesign
Canva

References

External links

Graphics software
Cloud applications
Collaborative software
Web applications